Manika Batra (born 15 June 1995) is an Indian table tennis player. As of November 2020, she is the top-ranked female table tennis player in India and ranked 44th in the world as of November 22. She was awarded the Major Dhyan Chand Khel Ratna in 2020.

Early life
Batra was born on 15 June 1995 as the youngest of three children. She hails from Naraina Vihar in Delhi and began playing table tennis at the age of four. Her elder sister Anchal and elder brother Sahil both played table tennis, with Anchal having an influence on her during her early playing career. After winning a match in a state-level under-8 tournament, Batra decided to train under coach Sandeep Gupta who suggested her to switch to Hans Raj Model School where he ran his academy.

Batra turned down many modelling offers as a teenager. When she was 16, she declined a scholarship to train at the Peter Karlsson Academy in Sweden. She studied at the Jesus and Mary College, New Delhi for a year before dropping out to concentrate on table tennis.

Career

In 2011, Batra won the silver medal in the under-21 category of the Chile Open. She represented India at the 2014 Commonwealth Games at Glasgow, where she finished quarterfinalist, as well as the 2014 Asian Games. She won three medals at the 2015 Commonwealth Table Tennis Championships, winning silver in the women's team event (with Ankita Das and Mouma Das) as well as the women's doubles event (with Ankita Das) and bronze in the women's singles event.

Batra won three gold medals at the 2016 South Asian Games, winning the women's doubles event (with Pooja Sahasrabudhe), mixed doubles event (with Anthony Amalraj) and women's team event (with Mouma Das and Shamini Kumaresan). Batra was denied a fourth gold medal at the Games by Mouma Das, who defeated her in the final of the women's singles event. She qualified for the women's singles event of the 2016 Summer Olympics by winning the South Asia group of the qualification tournament in April 2016. However, her appearance at the 2016 Olympics short-lived, as she lost to Katarzyna Grzybowska of Poland in the first round of the women's individual event.

Batra led the Indian women's team to a gold medal win in the final against four-time gold medalists and defending champions Singapore at the 2018 Commonwealth Games in Gold Coast, Australia. The Singapore women's table tennis team had never lost in the Commonwealth Games since the sport was inducted in the program in 2002. Batra defeated world number 4 Feng Tianwei as well as Zhou Yihan in India's 3–1 win in the final.

Batra and Mouma Das won India's maiden silver medal in the women's doubles category at the 2018 Commonwealth Games losing to defending champions Feng Tianwei and Yu Mengyu of Singapore in the gold medal clash.
Batra became the first Indian woman to bag a commonwealth table tennis individual gold medal in CWG 2018 by beating Yu Mengyu of Singapore. She won 4 medals in 4 events she was participating out of which 2 are gold, 1 silver and 1 bronze medal.

At the 2019 Commonwealth Table Tennis Championships, Batra was the member of the women's team which win the gold by defeating Singapore in the final.

At the 2020 Summer Olympics, Batra reached the third round of the women's singles event,  becoming the first Indian paddler to reach the third round at the Olympics in a singles event.

Batra won the 2021 wtt contender Budapest mixed doubles with Sathiyan Gnanasekaran by outplaying Hungary's Dora Madarasz and Nandor Ecseki 3-1. Batra then won wtt contender Lasko 2021 women's doubles with Archana Girish Kamath by beating Diaz Sisters pair of Melanie Diaz and Adriana Diaz from Puerto Rico 11-3, 11-8, 12-10. The Indian duo saved four game points in the third set to seal the match.

Batra participated at the 1st ever WTT Grand Smash event which was the Singapore Smash 2022. In the singles her run ended in the 1st round after losing to Zhang Mo. In the mixed doubles she and Sathiyan Gnanasekaran lost top seeds Lin Yun-ju and Cheng I Ching in straight games 3-0. In the women's doubles event she and Archana Girish Kamath lost to Japanese pair of Hina Hayata and Mima Itō 3-0 in the Quarter-finals.

Batra settled for silver at WTT Contender Doha 2022 with Sathiyan Gnanasekaran in mixed doubles where they lost against the top-seeded Chinese Taipei pair of Lin Yun-ju and Cheng I-Ching. The Indians lost 4-11, 5-11, 3-11 in straight games. Batra then bagged a bronze at WTT Star Contender Doha 2022 in women's doubles event with Archana Girish Kamath. They lost in the Semi-finals to Li Yu-Jhun and Cheng I-Ching 8-11, 6-11, 7-11.

On 5 April 2022, the pair of Batra and Archana Girish Kamath reached the pair ranking of world no. 4 which is the highest ever ranking by an Indian tennis player in all categories (Men's Singles, Women's Singles, Men's Doubles, Women's Doubles, Mixed Doubles).

Controversies
In September 2021, Batra accused Indian National Coach Soumyadeep Roy of pressuring her to throw a match at the Olympic Qualifiers (in March) to his personal student.

Awards
2020 – Major Dhyan Chand Khel Ratna, highest sporting honour of India
2018 – Arjuna Award, second-highest sporting honour of India
2018 – The Breakthrough Star Award by ITTF

In the media
Batra was featured on the cover of the July 2018 issue of Femina.

She also featured in the November 2018 edition of Vogue Magazine.

References

External links 
 
 International Table Tennis Federation's profile
 Manika Batra profile
 

1995 births
Living people
Indian female table tennis players
Racket sportspeople from Delhi
Sportswomen from Delhi
Table tennis players at the 2016 Summer Olympics
Table tennis players at the 2020 Summer Olympics
Olympic table tennis players of India
21st-century Indian women
21st-century Indian people
Table tennis players at the 2014 Asian Games
Table tennis players at the 2018 Asian Games
Asian Games medalists in table tennis
Asian Games bronze medalists for India
Medalists at the 2018 Asian Games
Table tennis players at the 2018 Commonwealth Games
Table tennis players at the 2022 Commonwealth Games
Commonwealth Games medallists in table tennis
Commonwealth Games gold medallists for India
Commonwealth Games silver medallists for India
Commonwealth Games bronze medallists for India
Delhi University alumni
South Asian Games gold medalists for India
South Asian Games silver medalists for India
South Asian Games medalists in table tennis
Recipients of the Khel Ratna Award
Recipients of the Arjuna Award
Medallists at the 2018 Commonwealth Games